The 2019 New York City Public Advocate election was held on November 5, 2019. Incumbent Jumaane Williams, who won the special election earlier in the year, was elected.

Democratic primary

Candidates

Declared
 Jumaane Williams, Incumbent

Republican primary

Candidates

Declared
 Joe Borelli, New York City Council member from the 51st District

Libertarian Party

Candidates

Declared
 Devin Balkind, Chair of the Brooklyn Libertarian Party
 Daniel Christmann

General Election results

References

2019 New York (state) elections
2019
2019 in New York City